Dejan Maksić (born September 20, 1975) is a Serbian footballer who most recently played for Floriana, a club playing in the Maltese Premier League.

Career
Maksić played as a goalkeeper for Pegah Gilan, FK Čukarički, PFC CSKA Sofia and Samsunspor before signing for Floriana F.C. He boasts of UEFA Champions League experience with CSKA Sofia. In the UEFA Champions League qualifying match CSKA Sofia defeated Liverpool 0-1 in Anfield with Maksić between the posts. In January 2006, he left for Samsunspor, with Oliver Kovačević move to opposite direction.

With Floriana, Maksić played 12 matches and kept 6 clean sheets, recording 6 wins, 3 draws and 3 defeats.

He ended his career because knee injury (2008).

Personal life
He is married and has five children (Mina, Sara, David, Maksim, Dunja).

External links
 Dejan Maksić at MaltaFootball.com
 Profile at TFF

Serbian footballers
Serbian expatriate footballers
FK Čukarički players
Pegah Gilan players
PFC CSKA Sofia players
Samsunspor footballers
Floriana F.C. players
Expatriate footballers in Iran
Expatriate footballers in Bulgaria
Expatriate footballers in Turkey
Expatriate footballers in Malta
Sportspeople from Šabac
1975 births
Living people
Serbian expatriate sportspeople in Bulgaria
First Professional Football League (Bulgaria) players
Association football goalkeepers